The name given to the anterior part of the vaginal portion of the cervix.

Obstetrics 
The anterior section of the cervix is nearly always the last part of the woman's cervix to be finally taken up into the lower segment of the uterus. An anterior lip occurs when the top of the cervix swells, but the rest of the cervix has completely dilated.
An anterior lip can slow the woman's progress from the 1st to 2nd stage of labor, because the swelling will usually take time to reduce, before enabling the woman's cervix to be pulled up, and around, the baby's head.

References 

Mammal female reproductive system